Lypotigris reginalis is a moth in the family Crambidae. It was described by Caspar Stoll in 1781. It is found in Suriname, Trinidad and Tobago, Central America (Costa Rica, Honduras), the West Indies and Florida.

References

Moths described in 1781
Spilomelinae